St. Xavier High School is a Catholic all-boys, college preparatory Xaverian school in Louisville, Kentucky. It is located in the Archdiocese of Louisville. St. Xavier was founded in 1864 by Br. Paul Van Gerwen, C.F.X. 

The school is located at 1609 Poplar Level Road and is the only school in Kentucky that has received the Blue Ribbon of Excellence Award four times, the most recent of which was awarded in 2016. St. Xavier has also renovated the school grounds with Project X, an initiative to raise $28 million for new academic and athletic facilities. In total Project X raised $29.1 million for the school. In 2016, it was voted "Best Private High School" in the Louisville Magazine.

Athletics
St. Xavier has the largest enrollment of boys among Kentucky high schools,  and had been the only school in Kentucky to have won a state championship in every Kentucky High School Athletic Association (KHSAA)-sanctioned sport open to boys before the KHSAA began sponsoring coeducational championships in bass fishing and archery in the early 21st century. St. Xavier is one of the most successful athletic programs in Kentucky, having won 172 boys' state championships across 13 different KHSAA sports. In 2005, St. Xavier was ranked #14 in "Sports Illustrated" Best High School Athletic Programs. In the 2009 fall semester, Saint X won all four fall sports. This is an unprecedented feat, taking home championships in soccer, football, cross country and golf.

The annual football game with traditional local rival Trinity High School at L&N Federal Credit Union Stadium is promoted by the schools as the most-attended annual regular-season high school football game in the country, typically drawing over 35,000 fans. The largest crowd was 38,500 and the 2007 edition of the game had an announced attendance of 37,550. Both teams have also met in the KHSAA Commonwealth Gridiron Bowl. As of 2018, St. Xavier has 12 state championships, with the last one being in 2009. In 2018, St. X announced that Kevin Wallace would be named new football head coach after Will Wolford announced that he would resign. The swim team has won thirty-one consecutive state swimming championships, a national record for consecutive state championships out of any sport. They have beat the record from a high school in the Hawaiian Islands
. In addition to this, the swim team has captured 55 swimming state titles overall, which is a national record. The golf team has won the McDonald's Tournament of Champions national event multiple times and sent numerous golfers on to NCAA Division I colleges such as Kentucky, Louisville, Alabama, Wake Forest, Clemson, Cornell, Tennessee, Florida, Florida State, Oklahoma State, Ohio State and Purdue. In 2016, St. X made a 3-peat by winning its 21st title and joined Louisville Male High School to win more than 2 more titles.

As of 2018, the cross country team has won 6 of the last 7 State Championships, and was nationally ranked in the top 15 in 2012–13. In 2012, the team which consisted of 6 future NCAA DI athletes, qualified for and competed in Nike Cross Nationals, the only consensus national championship competition in all of American High School athletics. The Tigers placed 14th. In 2016, the cross country team was ranked 13th at the nationals. In addition, it won several titles along with Floyd Central at a Tiger Run meeting. The soccer team has won eight state championships since 2000, earning top 10 rankings in national polls while doing so.

The Tigers' football home of Brother Thomas More Page Stadium also hosts the Bellarmine Knights sprint football team, representing nearby Bellarmine University.

Project X 
Saint Xavier has done renovations with Project X. Project X first did renovations with a $3 million classroom. Project X also resulted in a new tennis facility, complete with concessions and seating for 300 spectators, a new baseball stadium and a new 6,100 seat football stadium, complete with two private suites, an 8-lane rubberized track, new space for offices and locker rooms. The Tigers opened the new baseball complex on March 26, 2007, with a 10–0 win over Meade County, opened the football stadium on August 24, 2007, with an 18–14 victory over Ballard and opened the 2,000 seat basketball arena with a 73–53 win over South Oldham on January 20, 2009.

With the conclusion of Project X, St. Xavier now boasts some of the best high school athletic facilities in the nation including an indoor golf facility on campus.

Notable alumni

Academics
Michael Dorris, prominent novelist (The Broken Cord, The Yellow Raft in Blue Water) and scholar; The Broken Cord won 1989 National Book Critics Circle Award for General Nonfiction
Rudy Rucker, computer scientist, mathematician, and science fiction author
W. Kip Viscusi, economist

Athletics
Frank Beard, former PGA Tour golfer
Clark Burckle, member of USA Swimming National Team
Chris Burke, MLB player for Arizona Diamondbacks
Ray Burse, Major League Soccer (MLS) goalkeeper for FC Dallas
Paul Byrd, MLB pitcher for Boston Red Sox
Bobby Curtis, Big East champion and NCAA All-American Cross Country, Track & Field athlete
Lee Huber, All-American with Kentucky Wildcats, early professional with Akron Goodyear Wingfoots
Mo Moorman, former National Football League player for Kansas City Chiefs
Bobby Nichols, professional golfer, winner of 1964 PGA Championship
Scott Padgett, former NCAA champion with Kentucky Wildcats and NBA player; head coach at Samford University
Will Rabatin, football player
Lee Reherman, former American Gladiator, American football player, and actor
Desmond Ridder, American football player
Mike Silliman, Olympic gold medalist and NBA player
Bob Talamini, American football player
Justin Thomas, professional golfer, winner of the PGA Championship in 2017 and 2022
Will Wolford, former NFL player and owner of Louisville Fire; St. Xavier head football coach, 2013–2018

Business
John C. Lechleiter, CEO of Eli Lilly and Company

Entertainment and media
Leo Burmester, actor
Tom Cruise, actor (transferred before graduation)
Bob Edwards, former Sirius XM Radio and National Public Radio host
Carl Ellsworth, screenwriter (Red Eye and Disturbia, among others)
Jim James, lead singer in band My Morning Jacket
William Mapother, actor 
Victor Mature, actor, 1940s and '50s film star
Sean O'Bryan, actor
Don Rosa, Eisner Award-winning writer and artist of Donald Duck and Uncle Scrooge comic books
 
Government
Frank W. Burke, former Democratic member of United States House of Representatives and mayor of Louisville
Jack Conway, Kentucky Attorney General
Romano L. Mazzoli, former Democratic member of United States House of Representatives
Chris Seelbach, Cincinnati City Councilmember
Justin R. Walker, United States district judge of the Western District of Kentucky

Musicians
EST Gee, rapper
Jim James, lead singer of My Morning Jacket

See also
List of schools in Louisville, Kentucky

Footnotes

References

External links
 

Educational institutions established in 1864
1864 establishments in Kentucky
Roman Catholic schools in Louisville, Kentucky
Catholic secondary schools in Kentucky
Schools sponsored by the Xaverian Brothers
Boys' schools in Kentucky
High schools in Louisville, Kentucky